The Mixed team normal hill event of the FIS Nordic World Ski Championships 2017 was held on 26 February 2017.

Results
The first round was started at 17:30 and the second round at 19:18.

References

Mixed team normal hill